The Banqiao Reservoir Dam is a dam on the River Ru, a tributary of the Hong River in Zhumadian City, Henan province, China. The Banqiao dam and Shimantan Reservoir Dam are among 62 dams in Zhumadian that failed catastrophically in 1975 during Typhoon Nina. The dam was subsequently rebuilt.

History

Construction

Construction of the Banqiao dam began in April 1951 on the Ru River with the help of Soviet consultants as part of a project to control flooding and provide electrical power generation. The construction was a response to severe flooding in the Huai River Basin in 1949 and 1950. Because of the absence of hydrology data, the design standard was lower than usual. After the 1954 Huai River great flood, the upstream reservoirs including Banqiao were extended, constructed, and consolidated. The total capacity of the reservoir was 492 million m3 (398,000 acre feet), with 375 million m3 (304,000 acre feet) reserved for flood storage.

Cracks in the dam and sluice gates appeared after completion due to construction and engineering errors. They were repaired with the advice from Soviet engineers and the new design, dubbed the iron dam, was considered unbreakable.

Whistle-blower
Chen Xing, one of China's foremost hydrologists, was involved in the design of the dam but he was also a vocal critic of the government's dam building policy which involved many dams in the basin. He had recommended 12 sluice gates for the Banqiao Dam but this was criticized as being excessive and the number was reduced to five.  Other dams in the project, including the Shimantan Dam, had a similar reduction of safety features and Chen was removed from the project. In 1961, after problems with the water system were revealed, Chen was brought back to help. He continued to be an outspoken critic of the system and was again removed from the project.

1975 Banqiao Dam failure

In August 1975, the Banqiao dam collapsed, creating the third-largest flood in history which affected a total population of 10.15 million and inundated around 30 cities and counties of 12,000 square kilometers (or 3 million acres), with an estimated death toll ranging from tens of thousands to 240,000.

Reconstruction
Within eleven years of the dam failure, the lower reach of the River Ru, esp. Zhumadian City, experienced several more disastrous floods. After many feasibility studies, the new Banqiao Reservoir reconstruction was listed as a key national project of The Seventh Five-Year Plan of China. The project owner was Huai River Water Resources Commission. The construction contractor was Changjiang Gezhouba Engineering Bureau. By the end of 1986, the rebuilding project commenced. On June 5, 1993, the project was certified by the Chinese government.

The maximum reserve capacity is 675 million m3 (178 billion gallons), a capacity increase of 34% above the capacity of the failed dam. The flood control storage is 457 million m3 (121 billion gallons).

Legacy
After the disaster of the Banqiao dam failure, the Chinese government became very focused on surveillance, repair, and consolidation of reservoir dams. China has 87,000 reservoirs across the country; most of which were built in the 1950s–1970s using low construction standards. Most of these reservoirs are in serious disrepair, posing challenges to the prevention and control of flood-triggered geological disasters in areas with a population of 130 million or more. China's medium and small rivers are considered to be the Achilles' heel in the country's river control systems. According to a report from 2010, by the Ministry of Water Resources, China has invested  since the 1998 Yangtze River floods in repairing and consolidating the country's 9,197 degraded reservoirs, of which 2,397 are large or medium-sized, and 6,800 are key small reservoirs.

See also
 List of hydroelectric power station failures
 Hydraulic engineering
 Natural disasters in China

References

External links
Human Rights Watch report
 Excerpt from Silenced Rivers: The Ecology and Politics of Large Dams, by Patrick McCully
A Procedure for Estimating Loss of Life Caused by Dam Failure (PDF)
Flood and Drought in the History, Hydrology Department of Henan (Simplified Chinese)
The Worst Dam Failure in the World, The Truth of the Failure of Ban Qiao Dam, Henan (Simplified Chinese) (Translated)
Typhoon Nina Track
The River Dragon Has Come!: The Three Gorges Dam and the Fate of China's Yangtze River and Its People
transcript:four-episode documentary film: Remember the Flood in August 1975

Buildings and structures in Henan
Dams in China
Dams completed in 1993